The following is the discography of Spanish flamenco guitarist Paco de Lucía.

Albums

Studio albums

Collaborative albums

Compilation albums

Live albums

Albums accompanying singers
Paco de Lucía was the lead guitarist accompanying singers on their albums, often with his name noted in the album's title.

 Flamenco Festival Gitano recorded 1966 - 1971
 Volume 3 (L&R records L&R 44.015) (in cuadro) released 1986
 Volume 4 (L& R Records L&R 12L0101 recorded 1969, released 1981
 El Chato de La Isla
 (Polydor EP 334 FEP) 1966
 Canta El Chato de la Isla 1967 (Fontana 701 968 WPY)
 Manuel Soto "El Sordera"
 1967 (Polydor 342 FEP)
 Gaspar de Utrera
 1967 (Polydor 341 FEP)
 El Sevillano
 six Polydor EPs, 1967
 El Sevillano con Paco de Lucía (1972 LP)
 El Lebrijano
 EL Lebrijano: De Sevilla a Cádiz 1969 (Columbia LP CS 8002)
 El Lebrijano con la Collaboración Especial de Paco de Lucía 1970 (Polydor 23 85 006)
 Juan de la Vara
 1970 (Hispavox EP 16/748)
 Enrique Montoya
 1971 (Discophon 3024)
 Niño de Barbate
 Niño de Barbate con la Collaboración Especial de Paco de Lucía 1971 (TIP 24 56 016 and 24 56 017)
 Naranjito de Triana
 Naranjito de Triana: A Triana 1971 (RCA Victor LPM 10 416)
 Pepe de Lucía
 Pepe de Algeciras (Polydor 343), 1966 (malagueña "De Mi Larga Enfermedad", bulerías "Desterrado Me Fui Para El Sur", tientos "Pesaba Este Cuerpo Mío", soleá "La Muerte Pedía Yo")
 El Mundo Flamenco de Paco de Lucia (Philips 63 28 025), 1971
 Pepe de Lucia y Paco de Lucia (Triumph S 249 6202), 1972
 Caminando (Polydor 813 488-1), 1983
 El Orgullo De Mi Padre (Nuevos Medios NM 15 686 CD), 1995
 Fosforito 1968-1972
 EPs: Belter 52 190, 52 275, 52 361, 52 365
 LPs: Belter 22 219, 22 360, 22 362, 22 587, 22 588
 Fosforito: Selección Antológica (Belter 75.012, 75.013, 75.014, 75.015, re-released on 2-CD set as Fosforito con Paco de Lucía, Selección Antológica del Cante Flamenco, Iris Music France B00005MH91)
 Antonio Mairena
 Antonio Mairena: Cantes en Londres ye en La Union Pasarela PRD-107 (Live performance with Manuel Morao in London in 1954 and with Paco at La Union, February 16, 1974, released 1984)
 Camarón de la Isla
Officially, the simple descriptive title for five of the first six collaborative albums by these two performers, excluding Canastera, was El Camarón de la Isla con la colaboración especial de Paco de Lucía, but each of the five came to be identified by the title of their first track.
 Al Verte las Flores Lloran (1969)
 Cada Vez que Nos Miramos (1970)
 Son Tus Ojos Dos Estrellas (1971)
 Canastera (1972)
 Una Noche en Torres Bermejas (1972, but recorded in 1969), Philips 63 28 033), live with Camarón and Pepa de Utrera.
 Caminito de Totana (1973)
 Soy Caminante (1974)
 Arte y Majestad (1975)
 Rosa María (1976)
 Castillo de Arena (1977)
 Camarón en la Venta de Vargas (2006)
 Camarón de la Isla (also with Tomatito)
 Como el Agua (1981)
 Calle Real (1983)
 Viviré (1984)
 Potro de Rabia y Miel (1992)

Other contributions
  Poets in New York (Poetas en Nueva York) (contributor, Federico García Lorca tribute album, 1986)
 accompanied two songs on Jazz Flamenco: Pedro Iturralde (Hispavox HH S 11'28)
 Composed or contributed to the soundtracks for 
 La Sabina
 The Hit by Stephen Frears
 Flamenco, Flamenco (2011), Carmen and Sevillanas by Carlos Saura
 Montoyas y Tarantos
 Soñadores de España(1992), Plácido Domingo & Manuel Alejandro
 Vicky Cristina Barcelona
 One song contributed to Life Aquatic With Steve Zissou Soundtrack (La Nina de Puerta Oscura) (2004)
 Elegant Gypsy by Al Di Meola (1977) - de Lucía plays a duet with Di Meola on the track "Mediterranean Sundance".
Shpongle sampled his track "Introduccion y Pantomima" in their song "Around the World in a Tea Daze" from the album Tales of the Inexpressible.

Further information 

A tentatively complete discography of Lucía, including cover-photos and listing all his appearances, both in his own right and with other artists whomsoever, has been compiled by the flamenco guitarist Mark Shurey "Pimientito", and was presented by him on the flamenco forum www.foroflamenco.com.

References 

Flamenco discographies
Jazz discographies
Discographies of Spanish artists